Jambo is an unauthorized compilation album by British Afro rock band Osibisa released in 1992 by Soundwings Records (MC-102.1079-2) and distributed by Serenade S.A., Barcelona, Spain.
This album is a re-release of 1989 vinyl album Movement issued by German label in-akustik, in-akustik under 89021 LP catalog number.

The title comes from "Jambo!" a greeting in the Swahili language.

Track listing

Original release
Original 1989 LP release by in-akustik, in-akustik

Side A:
Ko Ko Rio Ko
Pata Pata
The Lion’s Walk
Inkosi Sikeleli Africa

Side B:
Movements
Drums 2001 Carnival
Jambo
Life
Happy Feeling Rhymes

References
All information gathered from back CD cover Jambo (Copyright © 1992 Soundwings Records MC-102.1079-2).
 Discogs ref. Jambo   
Discogs ref. Movements   

1992 compilation albums
Osibisa albums